Mogulu may refer to:

 Yujiulü Mugulü, former of the Rouran Khaganate, also known as Mogulu.
 Mogulu (town), is a populated place in the Western Province of Papua New Guinea.
 Mogulu', Romanian trap artist.